Alex Fellows (born 1979) is a Canadian cartoonist, illustrator, and painter, based in Montreal, Quebec, Canada.

Background

Fellows' first comic, Blank Slate, was published online in 2002.  With the help of a Xeric Grant, he later published a graphic novel.

In 2011, he won the Doug Wright Award for Best Emerging Talent for his comic, Spain and Morocco.  He had also been nominated for the award in 2005  Spain & Morocco was published in 2014 by Conundrum Press.

See also

References

External links
Spain and Morocco website

Doug Wright Award winners for Best Emerging Talent
Living people
1979 births